The Cathedral of the Sacred Heart of Jesus is a church located in Taman Sri Tebrau, Johor Bahru, Johor, Malaysia. The Cathedral itself is also situated in the heart of the most densely populated area in Johor Bahru, surrounded by housing estates such as Melodies Garden, Taman Sri Tebrau, Taman Pelangi, Century Garden, Taman Sentosa, Kebun Teh and Majidee Park.

History
It was completed in 1982, officially dedicated on 19 February by Bishop Emeritus James Chan, in the presence of the then-Apostolic Delegate Archbishop Renato Martino (now Cardinal) and all the Bishops of the Conference of Bishops for Malaysia, Singapore and Brunei. 

At present, it has a seating capacity for approximately 700 parishioners per Mass compared to an estimated figure of 3500 parishioners attending the Cathedral. The 25th Dedication Anniversary of the Cathedral of the Sacred Heart of Jesus was recently held on 18 February 2007 by Bishop Emeritus Paul Tan of the Melaka-Johor Diocese and in the presence of the then-Apostolic Delegate, Archbishop Salvatore Pennachio. The theme for the celebration was "How Lovely is Your Dwelling Place".

See also
 Religion in Malaysia

Gallery

External links

 www.shcjb.org Official Site

1982 establishments in Malaysia
20th-century Roman Catholic church buildings in Malaysia
Buildings and structures in Johor Bahru
Churches in Johor
Roman Catholic cathedrals in Malaysia
Roman Catholic churches completed in 1982